Harry Alan J. Randall (born 18 December 1997) is an English professional rugby union player who plays as a scrum-half for Bristol Bears in Premiership Rugby. Harry Randall is the younger brother of Jake Randall, the Scarlets youngest ever player.

Club career
Randall was born in Slough, England, but moved aged four to the Amman Valley, Wales. He first played rugby at Tycroes.  He played for Llandovery College and Wales under-16s. At 17 Randall joined Hartpury College and played for England under-18s.

He signed for Bristol in 2018 and was described by the Bristol Post as "one of the most exciting young talents in the country". On 16 October 2020 Randall scored a try after 15 seconds in the final of the European Rugby Challenge Cup as Bristol defeated Toulon to win their first European trophy.

International career
Randall was a member of the England under-20 team that hosted the 2016 World Rugby Under 20 Championship and came off the bench as England defeated Ireland in the final. During the 2017 Six Nations Under 20s Championship he scored tries against Wales and Scotland and started in the last game which saw England defeat Ireland to complete the grand slam. Later that year Randall started in the final of the 2017 World Rugby Under 20 Championship as England finished runners up to New Zealand.

In January 2021 he was called into the England Senior team for the 2021 Six Nations. On 4 July 2021 Randall made his debut for the senior England team starting against the United States at Twickenham. He scored a try and was named player of the match.

On 18 October 2021 Randall was named as part of England's squad for the 2021 Autumn Nations Series. However, he withdrew from the squad on 31 October due to injury. He was replaced by Northampton Saints scrum-half Alex Mitchell.

As a result of his performances in the Gallagher Premiership and European Cup Competition, Randall was again called up to the England squad for the 2022 Six Nations Championship.

International tries

References

1997 births
Living people
English rugby union players
England international rugby union players
Bristol Bears players
Rugby union players from Slough
Rugby union scrum-halves